Matthew Bradley or Matt Bradley may refer to:

Matthew Bradley, actor in the 1975 film Next Door
Matt Bradley (born 1978), Canadian ice hockey player
Matt Bradley (American football) (1960–2002), American football linebacker
Matt Bradley (basketball) (born 1999), American college basketball player
Matt Bradley (The Goldbergs), character on the U.S. TV series The Goldbergs based on a real person